Wiborgia is an genus of plants in the family Fabaceae. It is found in Africa and was named for Erik Viborg by Carl Peter Thunberg.

References

Crotalarieae
Flora of Africa
Fabaceae genera